Philosophy and Theology is a peer-reviewed academic journal that publishes articles and reviews exploring connections between philosophy and theology. It was established in 1986 by Andrew Tallon at Marquette University and is the journal of the Karl Rahner Society. One issue of each volume is dedicated to Rahner's thought. Since 1997 the journal has been published on behalf of Marquette University by the Philosophy Documentation Center. All issues are available in electronic format.

Indexing
Philosophy and Theology is abstracted and indexed Academic Search, Current Abstracts, Expanded Academic ASAP, Index Philosophicus, InfoTrac OneFile, International Bibliography of Book Reviews of Scholarly Literature, International Bibliography of Periodical Literature, MLA International Bibliography, Periodicals Index Online, Philosopher's Index, Philosophy Research Index, PhilPapers, Religion Index, Religious and Theological Abstracts, and TOC Premier.

See also 
 List of philosophy journals
 List of theology journals

External links 
 
 Karl Rahner Society

English-language journals
Philosophy journals
Publications established in 1986
Biannual journals
Catholic studies journals
Philosophy Documentation Center academic journals
Contemporary philosophical literature